Daffy Duck and the Dinosaur is a 1939 Warner Bros. Merrie Melodies animated cartoon short directed by Chuck Jones. The cartoon was released on April 22, 1939, and is the first Daffy Duck cartoon directed by Jones.

Daffy Duck and the Dinosaur is set in a chronologically twisted Stone Age and features Daffy Duck going up against a caveman named Casper (who is a caricature of Jack Benny), and his pet Apatosaurus, Fido.

This is the last cartoon with the Vitaphone intro, which was first used in The Phantom Ship in 1936.

Plot

Casper (a caveman) and Fido (an apatosaur) go hunting for breakfast and come upon Daffy. Casper uses a slingshot to fire a rock at the duck who, until he realizes the danger, is casually floating along in a lake. He revs up to amazing speed, though barely keeping ahead of the rock. Finally, Daffy slides to a halt and, disguised as a traffic cop, causes the rock to wait while a swan crosses, as though at an intersection.  After that, Daffy waves the rock through and takes off in the other direction. The rock realizes it has been tricked and backtracks but Daffy races between Casper's and Fido's legs. Fido, bending down to peer between his legs to see where Daffy has gone, has his head impacted by the rock. The dazed dinosaur performs a silly dance before floating to the ground, asleep.

Casper, upon seeing Daffy behaving decidedly not like a regular duck in water, says,  "Gosh, that duck acts like he's crazy."  Daffy replies, "That is correct; absolutely one-hundred percent correct!" and snaps the rubber of Casper's slingshot into the caveman's face. Casper decides to dive in after the duck and strips down. As he dives in, Daffy holds up a sign which indicates no swimming is allowed; Casper freezes in mid-dive then retreats to shore.

After ordering Fido to retrieve Daffy, which results only in Fido tying his own neck in a knot, the two leave.  Daffy, however, knows that Casper will not give up, so he paints an image of himself on a rock. Indeed, Casper returns with a club, sees the image and bashes it; the reverberation courses through his body. Daffy gives the caveman a glass of water, which cures the issue and results in Casper thanking the duck and offering to shake hands. Daffy gives him a card advertising "...the biggest, most luscious Duck..."  Casper and Fido head off in the direction indicated on the card, following a series of billboards (parodying advertising techniques of the era, including references to "The Breakfast of Champions" and "The Pause that Refreshes") Daffy has erected. They eventually reach an inflatable balloon duck which is being pumped up by Daffy. Casper is terrified by this until Daffy hands him a knife. Casper marches over and stabs the huge, angry-looking balloon duck. The ensuing explosion proves lethal enough to blow up Casper, Fido, and even Daffy himself.

The short ends showing the three in Heaven, lounging on clouds. Fido plays a harp while Daffy and Casper think about their mistakes. Daffy laments, "You know, maybe that wasn't such a hot idea after all!" Invoking Jack Benny's usual farewell, Casper says, "Good night, folks." as the scene irises out.

Production notes
Most of Chuck Jones-directed cartoons from this era (such as the ones featuring Sniffles the Mouse) were very heavily inspired by Walt Disney's cartoon shorts, placing more emphasis on story and animation than gags. Daffy Duck and the Dinosaur shows the faintest hints of deviation from such cartoons, which eventually led to the fast-paced Jones cartoons of the 1940s, such as The Dover Boys and The Draft Horse.

This is also an important milestone in the evolution of Daffy Duck's personality. While Tex Avery and Bob Clampett had depicted Daffy as completely insane, irrational, and uncontrollable in their previous cartoons with the character, Jones depicted Daffy here as somewhat more thoughtful and calculating. Jones and Friz Freleng continued to develop Daffy's personality in this direction throughout the 1940s and 1950s.

References

External links

Daffy Duck and the Dinosaur at Big Cartoon Database

1939 animated films
1939 short films
Merrie Melodies short films
Short films directed by Chuck Jones
1939 films
Vitaphone short films
Daffy Duck films
Animated films about dinosaurs
Animated films set in prehistory
1930s Warner Bros. animated short films
Films about cavemen
Animated films about cavemen
1930s English-language films